Else-Marie is a compound given name, composed of Else and Marie. Notable people with the name include:

 Else Marie Jakobsen (1927–2012), Norwegian designer and textile artist
 Else-Marie Lindgren (born 1949), Swedish politician
 Else-Marie Ljungdahl (born 1942), Swedish sprint canoer

Compound given names